This is a list of election results for the Electoral district of Hanson in South Australian elections.

Members for Hanson

Election results

Elections in the 1990s

 Hanson was made a notionally Labor held seat at the redistribution.

Elections in the 1980s

Elections in the 1970s

References

South Australian state electoral results by district